The Kinakh Government was created after the Ukrainian parliament had ousted the previous Cabinet of Viktor Yushchenko on April 26, 2001; it contained most of the ministers of its predecessor. On May 29, 2001, 239 deputies voted for the appointment of Anatoliy Kinakh, chairman of the Ukrainian Union of Industrialists and Entrepreneurs, as Prime Minister of Ukraine. His new government was Ukraine's tenth since Ukraine gained its independence in August 1991.

On November 16, 2002, President Kuchma sacked the cabinet claiming "it had not pursued enough reforms".

Composition

References

External links

Ukrainian governments
2001 establishments in Ukraine
2002 disestablishments in Ukraine
Cabinets established in 2001
Cabinets disestablished in 2002